Independence Day is an annual public holiday in Georgia observed on 26 May. It commemorates the 26 May 1918 adoption of the Act of Independence, which established the Democratic Republic of Georgia in the aftermath of the Russian Revolution of 1917. It is the national day of Georgia. Independence Day is associated with military parades, fireworks, concerts, fairs, and political speeches and ceremonies, in addition to various other public and private events celebrating the history and culture of Georgia.

Background
In the chaotic aftermath of the Russian Revolution of 1917, Georgia, which was annexed by the Russian Empire since the early 19th century, declared itself an independent Democratic Republic on 26 May 1918, after a brief and loose federative union with the fellow South Caucasian countries of Armenia and Azerbaijan. 

In February–March 1921 the Democratic Republic of Georgia fell to the invading Russian army and the country became a Soviet Socialist Republic, being annexed into the Soviet Union in 1922. Georgia seceded from the Soviet Union, adopting the Act of Reestablishment of Independence on 9 April 1991, on the second anniversary of the Soviet military crackdown on a large pro-independence rally in Georgia's capital of Tbilisi in 1989.

Due to its symbolism and historical significance, 9 April has been advocated to be recognized as Independence Day by the groups associated with the 1980s national movement and the government of Zviad Gamsakhurdia, which presided over the declaration of independence on 9 April 1991. During their rule (October 1990 – January 1992), Gamsakhurdia's government had instituted 26 May as Independence Day; the 9 April 1991 declaration stated it was based on the 26 May 1918 Act of Independence. The preceding referendum on 31 March 1991 had also asked the citizens of Georgia whether they wanted independence to be restored on the basis of the 26 May 1918 declaration. Georgia formally achieved independence on 26 December 1991 months after the failed coup, thus dissolving the Soviet Union. Since 1993, 9 April has been observed as the Day of National Unity, Civic Concordance, and Remembrance in Georgia.

History
 

 
26 May had been celebrated as the national day of the Democratic Republic of Georgia until the Soviet takeover in 1921. During the Soviet era, it was clandestinely and irregularly observed by segments of society opposed to the Communist regime. As the Georgian national movement gained momentum in the late 1980s, the symbols associated with the short-lived pre-Soviet republic became a rallying cry for those advocating independence from the Soviet Union. After Georgia's declaration of independence on 9 April 1991, the government set on 26 May 1991 Georgia's first presidential election, which was won by Zviad Gamsakhurdia. Georgia met 26 May of the next year with the new government led by Eduard Shevardnadze; Gamsakhurdia had been ousted in a military coup earlier that year. The 26 May 1992 celebration was attended by Shevardnadze's old acquaintance James Baker. The day also witnessed one of the first major anti-Shevardnadze demonstrations in the streets of Tbilisi.

Through much of Shevardnadze's rule, Independence Day was a civilian observance. Since 1997, no military parades had been organized by the government, citing financial difficulties. Shevardnadze's successor as President of Georgia, Mikheil Saakashvili, restored, in 2004, tradition of holding military parades, which was used as a venue to exhibit new equipment of the Georgian Armed Forces. 26 May 2004 saw the largest ever military parade in Georgia.

During Saakashvili's second term of presidency, the Independence Day celebrations were overshadowed by political instability; in 2008 and 2009 large opposition rallies in central Tbilisi limited the scale of the celebrations and in 2011 an attempt by part of the opposition at obstructing a military parade planned for 26 May led to fatalities during a clash with police.

After the Georgian Dream coalition acceded to power in 2012, a military component of the Independence Day celebration was limited to oath-taking ceremonies of Georgian soldiers and public exhibitions of military technology.

Notable anniversaries
 26 May 1918 – The National Council of Georgia adopts the Act of Independence of Georgia.
 26 May 1920 – Leaders of the Second International attend the Independence Day demonstration in Tbilisi as part of their visit to Georgia.
 26 May 1921 – The new Bolshevik government of Georgia marks Independence Day to celebrate the sovietization of Georgia, barring the national flags of the overthrown Democratic Republic of Georgia from being displayed during the celebrations.   
 26 May 1922 – Soviet security forces break up rallies to mark the Georgian Independence Day in Tbilisi and other places in the Georgian SSR. 
 26 May 1989 – Pro-independence demonstrators gather in Tbilisi to mark Independence Day for the first time since 1922.
 26 May 1991 – Georgia holds its first presidential election. A National Guard parade marks the first official post-Soviet Independence Day celebration.
 26 May 1992 – Georgian security forces break up a rally of supporters of the ousted President Gamsakhurdia, while James Baker attends the official celebrations of Independence Day.
 26 May 2004 – The new government of Georgia marks Independence Day with the largest-ever military parade.
 26 May 2011 – Police prevent attempts by an opposition party to block the venue of an Independence Day military parade, resulting in four deaths.
 26 May 2018 – Georgia celebrates the 100th anniversary of the declaration of independence of the First Republic of Georgia. More than 20 high level delegations arrive to attend the event, including the presidents of Poland, Slovakia, Latvia, Finland, Armenia, and the European Commission.
 26 May 2021 – Georgia celebrates the  30th anniversary of the restoration of independence. The remains of commander-in-chief of the Democratic Republic of Georgia Giorgi Kvinitadze were reburied with full military honors to the Mtatsminda Pantheon in Tbilisi on 26 May.

Videos 
 სამხედრო აღლუმი თბილისში. 1997 წელი

References 

Public holidays in Georgia (country)
May observances
Georgia